The 2017 Boston Red Sox season was the 117th season in the team's history, and their 106th season at Fenway Park. They finished with a 93 wins and 69 losses record, the same as their previous season, two games ahead of the second-place New York Yankees. It was also the team's first season in 15 years without David Ortiz, due to his retirement. The Red Sox won their second straight American League East championship, the first time the team won the division (which was established in 1969) in consecutive years; it was their ninth division title overall. In the postseason, they lost the American League Division Series in four games to the eventual 2017 World Series champions, the Houston Astros.

Offseason

October 2016
On October 16, general manager Mike Hazen left the Red Sox for the Arizona Diamondbacks.

November 2016
 On November 3, Brian Bannister was promoted to vice president of pitching development, in addition to his role as assistant pitching coach.
On November 4, bench coach Torey Lovullo left the Red Sox for the Arizona Diamondbacks to take over as manager.
On November 11, the Red Sox appointed Gary DiSarcina, former Lowell Spinners and Pawtucket Red Sox manager, as their new bench coach.
On November 15, DH David Ortiz officially retired.

December 2016
On December 6, the Red Sox traded 3B Travis Shaw with prospects RHP Josh Pennington, SS Mauricio Dubon and a player to be named later to the Milwaukee Brewers for reliever RHP Tyler Thornburg. The Brewers later received $100 instead of the PTBNL.
On December 6, the Red Sox traded prospects 3B Yoan Moncada, RHP Michael Kopech, CF Luis Alexander Basabe and RHP Víctor Díaz to the Chicago White Sox for starter LHP Chris Sale.
On December 8, the Red Sox acquired Josh Rutledge in the Rule 5 draft from the Colorado Rockies. Rutledge played parts of the 2015 and 2016 seasons with Boston.
On December 8, the Red Sox signed free agent 1B Mitch Moreland to a one-year, $5.5M deal.
 On December 20, the Red Sox traded RHP Clay Buchholz to the Philadelphia Phillies for 2B Josh Tobias.

Regular season

Opening Day, April 3 vs. Pittsburgh
Reigning AL Cy Young winner Rick Porcello made his first opening day start of his career, going 6  innings, allowing three runs on six hits in the win. The Red Sox bats could only get one hit off of Pirates starter Gerrit Cole through 4  innings but then strung together six 2-out hits. Jackie Bradley Jr. started the rally with a triple of the right field wall, Pablo Sandoval legged out an infield single, Sandy León laid down a bunt down the third base line, Dustin Pedroia with a single down the middle, which plated Pablo Sandoval, Andrew Benintendi with a three-run shot in the Pirates bullpen and Mookie Betts reached second on another infield single and a throwing error by the shortstop Jordy Mercer. Hanley Ramírez made the third out and Cole's day was over. Pittsburgh got to Porcello in the seventh, where he gave up three hits and three runs, two of them inherited by Matt Barnes. Barnes eventually got out of the inning. Neither team would score in the remainder of the game and Craig Kimbrel closed out the game on one hit and one hit batsman.

Opening Day lineup

April
April 3–6, vs. Pittsburgh
In his Red Sox debut, Chris Sale struck out seven Pirates batters in his 7 shut-out innings. He received no run support until a three-run walk-off shot by Sandy León in the 12th inning. Game three of the series was postponed and rescheduled for April 13.
Red Sox won the series 2–0 (8–3 runs)
April 7–10, in Detroit
In the series opener, Steven Wright gave up four runs in 6  innings. Down by four runs going into the eighth, the Red Sox put a five spot on the board, including a three-run shot by Pablo Sandoval, only to have the bullpen give up two more runs to win it for the Tigers. In game two, Boston took an early 1–0 lead, but that's all they would get. Detroit scored four times against Eduardo Rodríguez and dropped two games in a row. With several players already down with the flu, Andrew Benintendi threw up during the sixth inning in the outfield but could finish the game. Rick Porcello gave up eleven hits but the Tigers could only push four players across the plate. In late game heroics, Boston scored four times to take the lead in the eighth. Craig Kimbrel gave up one run but eventually closed the game. Chris Sale went 7  innings, striking out 10 Tigers and allowing only two runs in the final game of the series, but that was enough for Detroit. Boston only scored once on a bases loaded, nobody out situation against Justin Verlander in the second inning.
Red Sox lost the series 1–3 (14–17 runs)
April 11–12, vs. Baltimore
Drew Pomeranz went 6 innings of one-run ball in his season debut. Boston up by one run, scored three runs each in the seventh and eighth inning to put the game out of reach. In the second game of the odd two-game series against a division rival, Steven Wright was pulled after 1  innings, giving up 8 runs on as many hits. The bullpen allowed four more runs over the course of the game. A rally in the middle innings, where Boston scored 5 runs in three consecutive innings, fell way short.
Red Sox tied the series 1—1 (13–13 runs)
April 13, vs. Pittsburgh
In the makeup game from the opening series of the season, Eduardo Rodríguez allowed two first innings runs before settling in. Down by two runs coming into the eighth, the Pirates allowed three men to reach with one out, two via base on balls. Mookie Betts scored the go-ahead run from first on a Hanley Ramírez double, but the close play at the plate was successfully challenged. Xander Bogaerts eventually drove in Hanley and Craig Kimbrel shut the door.
Red Sox won the series 1–0 (4–3 runs)
April 14–17, vs. Tampa Bay
Rick Porcello was shelled for 8 runs in  innings, the most since April 19, 2015 vs. Baltimore. Down by 8 runs coming into the ninth, the Red Sox rallied for three, but that was all they could get. The doubles streak of Mitch Moreland ended after seven consecutive games. Chris Sale pitched another gem in his third start and won his first game of the season. He allowed just three hits and one run in seven innings, striking out 12 Rays batters. Moreland scored twice, on a solo shot in the second and a Sandy León groundout, providing the only runs for Boston. Drew Pomeranz didn't make it through the fifth with five allowed runs, but the Red Sox out-hit the Rays 17–7. Pablo Sandoval ripped his team-leading fourth home run of the season onto the green monster. On Patriots' Day, the Red Sox played their traditional 11 am game and quickly scored four runs in the first two innings, after Tampa Bay took a two-run lead in the first. Steven Wright gave up three runs, one of them earned, in six innings of work. The bullpen kept the Rays off the scoreboard and Craig Kimbrel struck out the side for his sixth save of the season.
Red Sox won the series 3–1 (18–19 runs)
April 18–20, in Toronto
Brian Johnson outpitched Marcus Stroman in a game where both teams connected for 27 hits. The Jays rallied for three runs in the ninth, but came one run short. Rick Porcello allowed three unearned runs but received no run-support and the Red Sox where shut out for the first time this season. In the rubber match, Chris Sale pitched another great game with 8 shut out innings, striking out 13. The save streak of Craig Kimbrel ended on 25 on a lead-off home run by Kendrys Morales, he eventually got the win, striking out five of the seven batters he faced. Mookie Betts drove in three in the tenth on a two-out double.
Red Sox won the series 2–1 (12–11 runs)
April 21–23, in Baltimore
The Red Sox where shutout for the second time in three games. Dustin Pedroia had to leave the game in the eighth, after a controversial slide with his raised cleats into second base by Manny Machado. The Red Sox could not hold on to their 2–0 lead in the second game. Baltimore scored four times in the fourth and Steven Wright was pulled early. Eduardo Rodríguez pitched six shut out innings, allowing only one hit. He was aided by six runs and the first 5-for-5 performance by Andrew Benintendi of his career. Matt Barnes was ejected in the eighth on would be retaliation pitch against Machado, which hit his bat just inches away from his head. Barnes was eventually suspended for four games.
Red Sox lost the series 1–2 (8–8 runs)
April 26–27, vs. New York
The first game of the would-be three-game series was rained out and rescheduled for mid-July. In both games Rick Porcello and Chris Sale were given virtually no run support. Both allowed three runs, two earned. Sale struck out ten, but allowed 8 hits. Down just 0–1, Sale was back on the mound for the ninth, in which he gave up three straight hits, before being pulled with no outs recorded.
Red Sox lost the series 0–2 (1–6 runs)
April 28–30, vs. Chicago (NL)
The bats came to life with the reigning World Series champion in town. Boston scored five in the first off Jake Arrieta. The Cubs rallied in the seventh but came up short. An early 3–0 lead was lost in the seventh on account of two errors in the same play by the Boston defense. Steven Wright started his last game of the season, he opted for season-ending surgery five days later. The Red Sox got to their former closer Koji Uehara in the eighth inning, with the game being tied at two, for four runs. Hanley Ramírez hit home runs in back-to-back games. Eduardo Rodríguez pitched another good game with one run allowed over six frames. Matt Barnes became the team's leader in pitcher wins with 3.
Red Sox won the series 2–1 (15–13 runs)

Composite line score April

*Extra innings without runs are not displayed

May
May 1–4, vs. Baltimore
Mookie Betts got plunked by a 95-mph Dylan Bundy fastball in the first game of the series, but no warnings were issued and there weren't any further actions by either team. Rick Porcello gave up two runs in six innings. Baltimore scored three times in the 8th inning, aided by three Red Sox errors. Chris Sale threw behind Manny Machado in the first inning and both benches were warned. Orioles reliever Donnie Hart threw a pitch at Andrew Benintendi's head but was not ejected nor disciplined for his action. Sale picked up the win, allowing only three hits in 8 innings. He struck out 11. Kevin Gausman was ejected in the second inning of game three, in which he hit Xander Bogaerts with a 77-mph curveball. Later in the game, Adam Jones was ejected for arguing balls and strikes with homeplate umpire Sam Holbrook. Drew Pomeranz became the first Red Sox starter with three wins in his 5  innings of work. The bullpen pitched a shutout and Craig Kimbrel picked up his tenth save of the season, striking out the side on 12 pitches. In the final game of the series, emotions cooled down and there were no further retaliations. Kyle Kendrick, in his first start for Boston, surrendered six runs in the loss. Baltimore connected for 17 hits.
Red Sox tied the series 2–2 (14–17 runs)

May 5–7, at Minneapolis
Matt Barnes gave up a walk-off home run to former AL MVP Joe Mauer, after the Red Sox rallied for two runs in the ninth to tie the game. Eduardo Rodríguez pitched six innings, giving up three runs on seven hits. The bats came alive in the second game of the series, scoring eight runs in the second inning. The bases were empty with two outs before Chris Young started a rally with a solo home run. Nine batters reached base, eight of them via the hit and one of them on an error. Boston put three more runs on the board, including another home run by Young and by Sandy León. Rick Porcello went seven innings of one-run ball. In the rubber match, finally Chris Sale received decent run support. Boston tagged the AL ERA leader, with 0.66, Ervin Santana for three runs in the first inning, a Dustin Pedroia solo home run and an absolute blast by Andrew Benintendi with Xander Bogaerts on first, which left the ballpark. After Boston extended the lead to four, Sale struggled in the fifth and the Twins tied up the game, only to give up a two-run home run to Sandy León which barely left the park. Up by three in the eighth, Matt Barnes gave up a home run and could not make an out. Lefty Robby Scott got the out against the lefty batter but a run scored on the sacrifice fly. With the tying run on third and only one out, Craig Kimbrel came in in a high-leverage situation and struck out both batters he faced. In a 39-minute top of the ninth, seven consecutive players reached base safely with one out, before Deven Marrero grounded out. The inning was extended on a fielding error. Four more batters reached base safely, including three consecutive walks. Chris Young, the 15th batter of the inning, became the third out. Except for Marrero, every hitter in the line-up reached base safely; ten runs came across the plate to score. Santana allowed six runs in the game, all of them earned. He allowed only three runs in his previous six starts combined. Sale extended his 10+ strikeout streak to six.
Red Sox won the series 2–1 (32–12 runs)

May 9–11, at Milwaukee
The Brewers tagged Drew Pomeranz for six runs in four innings in the loss. Boston narrowed the gap to two runs in the fifth but Heath Hembree allowed three more runs in the sixth. Kyle Kendrick also allowed six runs in his start, a hole too deep for the offense to climb out of. Both teams collected 49 hits in the first two games combined. Coming into the game with a career ERA of 5.26 in day games, as opposed to his 3.36 ERA in night games, Eduardo Rodríguez pitched a three-hit, one-run game over six frames. He was pinch hit for in the seventh. Boston left the go-ahead run stranded at third with nobody out in the top of eighth. Craig Kimbrel was again summoned from the bullpen in a non-save situation, with the go-ahead run at first and one out in the bottom of the eighth. He struck out Eric Thames, allowed an infield hit and the runner from second advanced to third on a wild pitch. Kimbrel ended the threat with another strikeout. In the top of the ninth, Christian Vázquez walked and Deven Marrero reached on an error. Mookie Betts put three runs on the board with his fifth home run of the season. Kimbrel struck out the side on a total of nine pitches to secure the win—it was the third immaculate inning in Red Sox franchise history.
Red Sox lost the series 1–2 (15–19 runs)

May 12–14, vs. Tampa Bay
Red Sox lost the series 1–2 (12–19 runs)

May 16–17, at St. Louis
Red Sox won the series 2–0 (11–7 runs)

May 18–20, at Oakland
Red Sox lost the series 1–3 (20–22 runs)

May 23–25, vs. Texas
Red Sox won the series 3–0 (26–12 runs)

May 26–28, vs. Seattle
Red Sox won the series 2–1 (9–5 runs)

May 29–31, at Chicago
Red Sox won the series 2–1 (21–13 runs)

June

July

August

August 3–August 6, vs. Chicago White Sox

August 8–August 9, at Tampa Bay Rays

On August 9, the Red Sox defeated the Rays, 8–2, to extend their winning streak to eight games. In the fifth inning, Rick Porcello struck out the side on nine pitches; it was the fourth immaculate inning in franchise history and second of the season, following one by Craig Kimbrel on May 11.

August 11–August 13, at New York Yankees

August 14, vs. Cleveland Indians

August 15–August 16, vs. St. Louis Cardinals

August 18–August 20, vs. New York Yankees

August 21–August 24, at Cleveland Indians

August 25–August 27, vs. Baltimore Orioles
This three-game series was played on the inaugural Players Weekend, when MLB players are allowed and encouraged to put nicknames on the back of their uniforms. For the opening game, the nicknames used by Boston's starting lineup were as follows:

The August 25 game, a 16–3 win by Baltimore, was notable for the Red Sox making an illegal player re-entry late in the game, which went undetected at the time. With the Orioles leading by 13 runs, position player Mitch Moreland pitched the ninth inning for Boston, with Hanley Ramírez entering the game to play first base, resulting in loss of the designated hitter. Ramírez should have taken Chris Young's position in the batting order (seventh). However, with one out in the bottom of the ninth inning, Young batted in his (former) seventh position in the order, which is an illegal player re-entry. Young hit a single, and the game ended three batters later, with Young's hit having no bearing on the outcome of the game. The illegal player re-entry appears to be unique in MLB history.

September / October

Sign stealing revelations
In September 2017, the Red Sox were fined for their role in stealing signs from the rival New York Yankees. On February 4, 2020, MLB Network journalist Peter Gammons reported that former Red Sox player Chris Young, who left the Red Sox following the 2017 season, told him that Young was the mastermind of the Red Sox' Apple Watch scheme, telling him "I started the whole Apple Watch thing. I got it from when I was with the Yankees." Young later denied to SportsNet New York (SNY) that he told this to Gammons, and Gammons retracted his comments via Twitter, stating that Young's "word is gold." In reporting Young's denial, SNY also revealed that Young had in fact been interviewed by MLB officials as part of the 2017 investigation against the Red Sox and that multiple sources told the sports news agency that Young was in fact a leader of the team's 2017 Apple Watch scheme.

Postseason

2017 American League Division Series vs. Houston Astros

Game 1, October 5

Game 2, October 6

Game 3, October 8

Game 4, October 9

Composite line score 
2017 ALDS (1–3): Boston lost to Houston

Postseason rosters

| style="text-align:left" |
Pitchers: 22 Rick Porcello 24 David Price 31 Drew Pomeranz 38 Doug Fister 39 Carson Smith 41 Chris Sale 43 Addison Reed 46 Craig Kimbrel 52 Eduardo Rodríguez 56 Joe Kelly 71 Austin Maddox
Catchers: 3 Sandy León 7 Christian Vázquez 
Infielders: 2 Xander Bogaerts 11 Rafael Devers 12 Brock Holt 13 Hanley Ramírez 15 Dustin Pedroia 17 Deven Marrero 18 Mitch Moreland 36 Eduardo Núñez 
Outfielders: 16 Andrew Benintendi 19 Jackie Bradley Jr. 25 Rajai Davis 30 Chris Young  50 Mookie Betts
|- valign="top"

Season standings

American League East

American League Wild Card

Red Sox team leaders

 Minimum 3.1 plate appearances per team games played
AVG qualified batters: Benintendi, Betts, Bogaerts, Bradley, Moreland, Ramirez

 Minimum 1 inning pitched per team games played
ERA & WHIP qualified pitchers: Pomeranz, Porcello, Sale

Record against opponents

Roster

Game log

|- style="text-align:center; background:#bfb;"
| 1 || April 3 ||  Pirates || 5–3 || Porcello (1–0)  || Cole (0–1) || Kimbrel (1)  || Fenway Park || 36,594 || 1–0 || W1 
|- style="text-align:center; background:#bfb;"
| 2 || April 5 ||  Pirates || 3–0 (12) || Kelly (1–0) || Bastardo (0–1) ||—
| Fenway Park || 36,167 || 2–0 || W2
|- style="text-align:center; background:#bbb;"
| — || April 6 ||  Pirates ||colspan="8" | Postponed (rain). Makeup date: April 13. 
|- style="text-align:center; background:#fbb;"
| 3 || April 7 || @  Tigers || 5–6 || Rodríguez (1–0) || Hembree (0–1) ||—
| Comerica Park || 45,013 || 2–1 || L1
|- style="text-align:center; background:#fbb;"
| 4 || April 8 || @  Tigers || 1–4 || Zimmermann (1–0) || Rodríguez (0–1) ||  Wilson (1) || Comerica Park || 32,363 || 2–2 || L2
|- style="text-align:center; background:#bfb;"
| 5 || April 9 || @  Tigers || 7–5 ||Barnes (1–0) || Rondon (0–1) || Kimbrel (2)  || Comerica Park || 33,662 || 3–2 || W1
|- style="text-align:center; background:#fbb;"
| 6 || April 10 || @ Tigers || 1–2 || Wilson (1–0) || Sale (0–1) || Rodríguez (2) || Comerica Park || 24,672 || 3–3 || L1
|- style="text-align:center; background:#bfb;"
| 7 || April 11 || Orioles || 8–1 || Pomeranz (1–0) || Bundy (1–1) ||—
| Fenway Park || 37,497 || 4–3 || W1
|- style="text-align:center; background:#fbb;"
| 8 || April 12 ||  Orioles || 5–12 || Givens (2–0) || Wright (0–1) ||—
| Fenway Park || 32,211 || 4–4 || L1
|- style="text-align:center; background:#bfb;"
| 9 || April 13 || Pirates || 4–3 || Barnes (2–0) || Nicasio (0–2) || Kimbrel (3) || Fenway Park || 32,400 || 5–4 || W1
|- style="text-align:center; background:#fbb;"
| 10 || April 14 ||  Rays || 5–10 || Archer (2–0)|| Porcello (1–1) ||—
| Fenway Park || 36,813 || 5–5 || L1
|- style="text-align:center; background:#bfb;"
| 11 || April 15 ||  Rays || 2–1 || Sale (1–1) || Hunter (0–1) || Kimbrel (4) || Fenway Park || 36,686 || 6–5 || W1
|- style="text-align:center; background:#bfb;"
| 12 || April 16 ||  Rays || 7–5 || Kelly (2–0) || Farquhar (0–1)|| Kimbrel (5)  || Fenway Park || 36,209 || 7–5 || W2
|- style="text-align:center; background:#bfb;"
| 13 || April 17 || Rays || 4–3 || Wright (1–1) || Snell (0–2) || Kimbrel (6) || Fenway Park || 37,318 || 8–5 || W3
|- style="text-align:center; background:#bfb;"
| 14 || April 18 || @ Blue Jays || 8–7 || Johnson (1–0) || Stroman (1–2) ||—
| Rogers Centre || 29,281 || 9–5 || W4
|- style="text-align:center; background:#fbb;"
| 15 || April 19 || @ Blue Jays || 0–3 || Liriano (1–1) || Porcello (1–2) || Osuna (1) || Rogers Centre || 30,842 || 9–6 || L1
|- style="text-align:center; background:#bfb;"
| 16 || April 20 || @ Blue Jays || 4–1 (10) || Kimbrel (1–0) || Grilli (0–2) ||—
| Rogers Centre || 44,283 || 10–6 || W1
|- style="text-align:center; background:#fbb;"
| 17 || April 21 || @ Orioles || 0–2 || Bundy (3–1) || Pomeranz (1–1) || Brach (3) || Camden Yards || 34,442 || 10–7 || L1
|- style="text-align:center; background:#fbb;"
| 18 || April 22 || @ Orioles || 2–4 || Aquino (1–0) || Wright (1–2) || O'Day (1) || Camden Yards || 35,457 || 10–8 || L2
|- style="text-align:center; background:#bfb;"
| 19 || April 23 || @ Orioles || 6–2 || Rodríguez (1–1) || Gausman (1–2) || Kimbrel (7) || Camden Yards || 35,522 || 11–8 || W1
|- style="text-align:center; background:#bbb;"
| — || April 25 ||  Yankees || colspan="8" |Postponed (rain). Makeup date: July 16.
|- style="text-align:center; background:#fbb;"
| 20 || April 26 || Yankees || 1–3 || Severino (2–1) || Porcello (1–3) || Chapman (5) || Fenway Park || 32,072 || 11–9 || L1
|- style="text-align:center; background:#fbb;"
| 21 || April 27 || Yankees || 0–3 || Tanaka (3–1) || Sale (1–2) ||—
| Fenway Park || 34,054 || 11–10 || L2
|- style="text-align:center; background:#bfb;"
| 22 || April 28 || Cubs || 5–4 || Pomeranz (2–1) || Arrieta (3–1) || Kimbrel (8) || Fenway Park || 37,054 || 12–10 || W1
|- style="text-align:center; background:#fbb;"
| 23 || April 29 || Cubs || 4–7 || Lackey (2–3) || Wright (1–3) || Davis (6) || Fenway Park || 36,776 || 12–11 || L1
|- style="text-align:center; background:#bfb;"
| 24 || April 30 || Cubs || 6–2 || Barnes (3–0) || Uehara (0–2) ||—
| Fenway Park || 36,916 || 13–11 || W1
|-

|- style="text-align:center; background:#fbb;"
| 25 || May 1 || Orioles || 2–5 || Bundy (4–1) || Porcello (1–4) || Brach (5) || Fenway Park || 33,489 || 13–12 || L1
|- style="text-align:center; background:#bfb;"
| 26 || May 2 || Orioles || 5–2 || Sale (2–2) || Asher (1–1) || Kimbrel (9) || Fenway Park || 32,932 || 14–12 || W1
|- style="text-align:center; background:#bfb;"
| 27 || May 3 || Orioles || 4–2 || Pomeranz (3–1) || Gausman (1–3) || Kimbrel (10) || Fenway Park || 33,162 || 15–12 || W2
|- style="text-align:center; background:#fbb;"
| 28 || May 4 || Orioles || 3–8 || Wilson (2–1) || Kendrick (0–1) ||—
| Fenway Park || 36,563 || 15–13 || L1
|- style="text-align:center; background:#fbb;"
| 29 || May 5 || @ Twins || 4–5 || Kintzler (1–0) || Barnes (3–1) ||—
| Target Field || 28,707 || 15–14 || L2
|- style="text-align:center; background:#bfb;"
| 30 || May 6 || @  Twins || 11–1 || Porcello (2–4) ||  Tepesch (0–1)
|—
| Target Field || 30,859 || 16–14 || W1
|- style="text-align:center; background:#bfb;"
| 31 || May 7 || @ Twins || 17–6 || Sale (3–2) || Santana (5–1) ||—
| Target Field || 31,763 || 17–14 || W2
|- style="text-align:center; background:#fbb;"
| 32 || May 9 || @ Brewers || 7–11 || Torres (2–3) || Pomeranz (3–2) ||—
| Miller Park || 22,524 || 17–15 || L1
|- style="text-align:center; background:#fbb;"
| 33 || May 10 || @ Brewers || 4–7 || Scahill (1–1) || Kendrick (0–2) ||  || Miller Park || 23,095 || 17–16 || L2
|- style="text-align:center; background:#bfb;"
| 34 || May 11 || @ Brewers || 4–1 || Kimbrel (2–0) || Feliz (0–4) ||—
| Miller Park || 26,499 || 18–16 || W1
|- style="text-align:center; background:#fbb;"
| 35 || May 12 ||  Rays || 4–5 || Cobb (3–3) || Porcello (2–5) || Colomé (9) || Fenway Park || 36,496 || 18–17 || L1
|- style="text-align:center; background:#bfb;"
| 36 || May 13 ||  Rays || 6–3 || Sale (4–2) || Snell(0–4) || Kimbrel (11) || Fenway Park || 35,447 || 19–17 || W1
|- style="text-align:center; background:#fbb;"
| 37 || May 14 ||  Rays || 2–11 || Andriese (3–1) || Pomeranz (3–3) ||—
| Fenway Park || 35,080 || 19–18 || L1
|- style="text-align:center; background:#bfb;"
| 38 || May 16 || @ Cardinals || 6–3 || Rodríguez (2–1) || Lynn (4–2) || Kimbrel (12) || Busch Stadium || 41,514 || 20–18 || W1
|- style="text-align:center; background:#bfb;"
| 39 || May 17 || @ Cardinals || 5–4 (13) || Abad (1–0) || Tuivailala (2–1) || Taylor (1) || Busch Stadium || 44,365 || 21–18 || W2
|- style="text-align:center; background:#fbb;"
| 40 || May 18 || @  Athletics || 3–8 || Gray (1–1) || Velázquez (0–1) ||—
| Oakland Coliseum || 12,016 || 21–19 || L1
|- style="text-align:center; background:#fbb;"
| 41 || May 19 || @  Athletics || 2–3 (10) || Dull (2–2) || Hembree (0–2) ||—
| Oakland Coliseum || 24,728 || 21–20 || L2
|- style="text-align:center; background:#fbb;"
| 42 || May 20 || @  Athletics || 3–8 || Manaea (2–3) || Taylor (0–1) ||—
| Oakland Coliseum || 20,235 || 21–21 || L3
|- style="text-align:center; background:#bfb;"
| 43 || May 21 || @  Athletics || 12–3 || Rodríguez (3–1) || Triggs (5–3) ||—
| Oakland Coliseum || 20,691 || 22–21 || W1
|- style="text-align:center; background:#bfb;"
| 44 || May 23 ||  Rangers || 11–6 || Porcello (3–5) || Cashner (1–4) ||—
| Fenway Park || 34,769 || 23–21 || W2
|- style="text-align:center; background:#bfb;"
| 45 || May 24 ||  Rangers || 9–4 || Sale (5–2) || Dyson (1–5) ||—
| Fenway Park || 36,089 || 24–21 || W3
|- style="text-align:center; background:#bfb;"
| 46 || May 25 ||  Rangers || 6–2 || Pomeranz (4–3)  || Martinez (1–3) ||—
| Fenway Park || 33,484 || 25–21 || W4
|- style="text-align:center; background:#bfb;"
| 47 || May 26 || Mariners || 3–0 || Rodríguez (4–1) || Gallardo (2–5) || Kimbrel (13) || Fenway Park || 35,080 || 26–21 || W5
|- style="text-align:center; background:#bfb;"
| 48 || May 27 || Mariners || 6–0 || Johnson (2–0) || Whalen (0–1) ||—
| Fenway Park || 36,985 || 27–21 || W6
|- style="text-align:center; background:#fbb;"
| 49 || May 28 || Mariners || 0–5 || Bergman (2–2) || Porcello (3–6) ||—
| Fenway Park || 37,174 || 27–22 || L1
|- style="text-align:center; background:#fbb;"
| 50 || May 29 || @ White Sox || 4–5 || Minaya (1–0) || Barnes (3–2) || Robertson (8) || Guaranteed Rate Field || 27,148 || 27–23 || L2
|- style="text-align:center; background:#bfb;"
| 51 || May 30 || @ White Sox || 13–7 || Sale (6–2) || Quintana (2–7) || Kimbrel (14) || Guaranteed Rate Field || 21,852 || 28–23 || W1
|- style="text-align:center; background:#bfb;"
| 52 || May 31 || @ White Sox || 4–1 || Pomeranz (5–3) || Swarzak (2–1) || Kimbrel (15) || Guaranteed Rate Field || 19,075 || 29–23 || W2
|-

|- style="text-align:center; background:#fbb;"
| 53 || June 1 || @  Orioles || 5–7 || Miley (2–3) || Rodríguez (4–2) ||—
| Camden Yards || 20,150 || 29–24 || L1
|- style="text-align:center; background:#fbb;"
| 54 || June 2 || @  Orioles || 2–3 || Asher (2–3) || Porcello (3–7) || Brach (11) || Camden Yards || 33,193 || 29–25 || L2
|- style="text-align:center; background:#bfb;"
| 55 || June 3 || @  Orioles || 5–2 || Price (1–0) || Bundy (6–4) || Kimbrel (16) || Camden Yards || 35,470 || 30–25 || W1
|- style="text-align:center; background:#bfb;"
| 56 || June 4 || @  Orioles || 7–3 || Sale (7–2) || Tillman (1–3) || —
| Camden Yards || 31,819 || 31–25 || W2
|- style="text-align:center; background:#bfb;"
| 57 || June 6 || @  Yankees || 5–4 || Pomeranz (6–3) || Tanaka (5–6)|| Kimbrel (17)
| Yankee Stadium || 41,516 || 32–25 || W3
|- style="text-align:center; background:#fbb;"
| 58 || June 7 || @  Yankees || 0–8 || Sabathia (7–2) || Porcello (3–8)||—
| Yankee Stadium || 44,380 || 32–26 || L1
|- style="text-align:center; background:#fbb;"
| 59 || June 8 || @  Yankees || 1–9 || Pineda (7–3) || Price (1–1) ||—
| Yankee Stadium || 46,194 || 32–27 || L2
|- style="text-align:center; background:#bfb;"
| 60 || June 9 ||  Tigers || 5–3 || Barnes (4–2) || Wilson (1–3) || Kimbrel (18)
| Fenway Park || 36,853 || 33–27 || W1
|- style="text-align:center; background:#bfb;"
| 61 || June 10 ||  Tigers || 11–3 || Sale (9–2) || Saupold (1–1) ||—
| Fenway Park || 37,162 || 34–27 || W2
|- style="text-align:center; background:#fbb;"
| 62 || June 11 ||  Tigers || 3–8 || Norris (3–4) || Pomeranz (6–4) ||—
| Fenway Park || 35,457 || 34–28 || L1
|- style="text-align:center; background:#bfb;"
| 63 || June 12 || Phillies || 6–5 (11) || Barnes (5–2) || Fien (0–1) ||—
| Fenway Park || 36,757 || 35–28 || W1
|- style="text-align:center; background:#bfb;"
| 64 || June 13 ||  Phillies ||4–3 (12) || Abad (2–0) || García (1–1) ||—
| Fenway Park || 37,141 || 36–28 || W2
|- style="text-align:center; background:#bfb;"
| 65 || June 14 || @  Phillies || 7–3 || Velázquez (1–1) || Hellickson (5–5) ||—
| Citizens Bank Park || 28,263 || 37–28 || W3
|- style="text-align:center; background:#fbb;"
| 66 || June 15 || @  Phillies || 0–1 || Neshek (2–1) || Sale (8–3) || Neris (6) 
| Citizens Bank Park || 30,729 || 37–29 || L1
|- style="text-align:center; background:#bfb;"
| 67 || June 16 || @  Astros || 2–1 || Kelly (3–0) || Harris (2–2) || Kimbrel (19) 
| Minute Maid Park || 36,189 || 38–29 || W1
|- style="text-align:center; background:#fbb;"
| 68 || June 17 || @  Astros || 1–7 || Paulino (1–0) || Porcello (3–9) ||—
| Minute Maid Park || 41,017 || 38–30 || L1
|- style="text-align:center; background:#bfb;"
| 69 || June 18 || @  Astros || 6–5 || Price (2–1) || Musgrove (4–6) || Kimbrel (20) 
| Minute Maid Park || 38,389 || 39–30 || W1
|- style="text-align:center; background:#fbb;"
| 70 || June 19 || @  Royals || 2–4 || Hammel (4–6) || Boyer (0–1) || Herrera (16) 
| Kauffman Stadium || 27,992 || 39–31 || L1
|- style="text-align:center; background:#bfb;"
| 71 || June 20 || @  Royals || 8–3 || Sale (9–3) || Strahm (2–4) ||—
| Kauffman Stadium || 25,983 || 40–31 || W1
|- style="text-align:center; background:#fbb;"
| 72 || June 21 || @  Royals || 4–6 || Soria (3–2) || Scott (0–1) || Herrera (17)
| Kauffman Stadium || 30,826 || 40–32 || L1
|- style="text-align:center; background:#bfb;"
| 73 || June 23 ||  Angels || 9–4 ||Porcello (4–9) ||Meyer (3–4) ||—
| Fenway Park || 37,034 || 41–32 || W1 
|- style="text-align:center; background:#fbb;"
| 74 || June 24 ||  Angels || 3–6 || Ramirez (7–5) || Price (2–2) ||Parker (1)
| Fenway Park || 36,868 || 41–33 || L1
|- style="text-align:center; background:#fbb;"
| 75 || June 25 ||  Angels || 2–4 || Bridwell (2–0) || Fister (0–1) ||Petit (1)
| Fenway Park || 36,474 || 41–34 || L2
|- style="text-align:center; background:#bfb;"
| 76 || June 26 ||  Twins || 4–1 || Sale (10–3) || Berríos (7–2) || Kimbrel (21)
| Fenway Park || 37,172 || 42–34 || W1
|- style="text-align:center; background:#bfb;"
| 77 || June 27 ||  Twins || 9–2 || Pomeranz (7–4) || Santiago (4–7) ||—
| Fenway Park || 36,804 || 43–34 || W2
|- style="text-align:center; background:#fbb;"
| 78 || June 28 || Twins || 1–4 || Mejia (3–3) || Porcello (4–10) || Kintzler (21) || Fenway Park || 37,487 || 43–35 || L1
|- style="text-align:center; background:#bfb;"
| 79 || June 29 ||  Twins || 6–3 || Price (3–2) || Gibson (4–6) || Kimbrel (22) || Fenway Park || 37,445 || 44–35 || W1
|- style="text-align:center; background:#bfb;"
| 80 || June 30 || @  Blue Jays || 7–4 (11) || Boyer (1–1) || Loup (2–2) || Kimbrel (23) || Rogers Centre || 41,357 || 45–35 || W2
|-

|- style="text-align:center; background:#bfb;"
| 81 || July 1 || @  Blue Jays || 7–1 || Sale (11–3) || Liriano (4–4) || — || Rogers Centre || 46,672 || 46–35 || W3
|- style="text-align:center; background:#bfb;"
| 82 || July 2 || @  Blue Jays || 15–1 || Pomeranz (8–4) || Biagini (2–8) || Abad (1) || Rogers Centre || 46,696 || 47–35 || W4
|- style="text-align:center; background:#bfb;"
| 83 || July 3 || @  Rangers || 7–5 (11) || Hembree (1–2) || Frieri (0–1) || — || Globe Life Park || 45,448 || 48–35 || W5
|- style="text-align:center; background:#bfb;"
| 84 || July 4 || @  Rangers || 11–4 || Price (4–2) || Darvish (6–7) || — || Globe Life Park || 43,267 || 49–35 || W6
|- style="text-align:center; background:#fbb;"
| 85 || July 5 || @  Rangers || 2–8 || Cashner (4–7) || Fister (0–2) || — || Globe Life Park || 32,276 || 49–36 || L1
|- style="text-align:center; background:#fbb;"
| 86 || July 6 || @  Rays || 1–4 || Faria (4–0) || Sale (11–4) || Colomé (23) || Tropicana Field || 23,375 || 49–37 || L2
|- style="text-align:center; background:#bfb;"
| 87 || July 7 || @  Rays || 8–3 || Pomeranz (9–4) || Odorizzi (5–4) || — || Tropicana Field || 24,842 || 50–37 || W1  
|- style="text-align:center; background:#fbb;"
| 88 || July 8 || @  Rays || 0–1 || Cobb (7–6) || Porcello (4–11) || Colomé (24) || Tropicana Field || 23,419 || 50–38 || L1 
|- style="text-align:center; background:#fbb;"
| 89 || July 9 || @  Rays || 3–5 || Boxberger (1–0) || Kelly (3–1) || Colomé (25) || Tropicana Field || 20,812 || 50–39 || L2 
|- style="text-align:center; background-color:#bbcaff;"
| ASG || July 11 || All-Star Game || AL 2–1 (10) NL || Kimbrel (AL, BOS) (1–0) || Davis (NL, CHC (0–1) || Miller (AL, CLE) (1) || Marlins Park,Miami, FL || 37,188 ||  || Box
|- style="text-align:center; bgcolor="bbcaff"
| ASG ||colspan="10" | The Red Sox were represented in the All-Star game by Mookie Betts, Craig Kimbrel and Chris Sale.  Sale started the game for the AL, while Kimbrel appeared in the closer role.
|- style="text-align:center; background:#bfb;"
| 90 || July 14 ||  Yankees || 5–4 || Scott (1–1) || Chapman (2–1) || — || Fenway Park || 37,570 || 51–39 || W1
|- style="text-align:center; background:#fbb;"
| 91 || July 15 ||  Yankees ||  1–4 (16) || Heller (1–0) || Fister (0–3) || – || Fenway Park || 36,936 || 51–40 || L1
|- style="text-align:center; background:#fbb;"
| 92 || July 16 ||  Yankees || 0–3 || Sabathia (8–3) || Porcello (4–12) || Chapman (9) || Fenway Park || 37,343 || 51–41 || L2
|- style="text-align:center; background:#bfb;"
| 93 || July 16 || Yankees || 3–0 || Price (5–2) || Tanaka (7–9) || Kimbrel (24) || Fenway Park || 36,719 || 52–41 || W1
|- style="text-align:center; background:#fbb;"
| 94 || July 17 ||  Blue Jays || 3–4 || Tepera (5–1) || Hembree (1–3) || Osuna (23) || Fenway Park || 36,144 || 52–42 || L1
|- style="text-align:center; background:#bfb;"
| 95 || July 18 || Blue Jays || 5–4 (15) || Velázquez (2–1) || Bolsinger (0–3) || — || Fenway Park || 36,488 || 53–42 || W1
|- style="text-align:center; background:#bfb;"
| 96 || July 19 ||  Blue Jays || 5–1 || Pomeranz (10–4) || Sanchez (1–3) || — || Fenway Park || 37,360 || 54–42 || W2
|- style="text-align:center; background:#fbb;"
| 97 || July 20 ||  Blue Jays || 6–8 || Leone (2–0) || Fister (0–4) || Osuna (24) || Fenway Park || 37,094 || 54–43 || L1
|- style="text-align:center; background:#bfb;"
| 98 || July 21 || @  Angels || 6–2 || Sale (12–4) || Nolasco (4–11) || – || Angel Stadium || 37,714 || 55–43 || W1
|- style="text-align:center; background:#fbb;"
| 99 || July 22 || @  Angels || 3–7 || Ramírez (9–8) || Price (5–3) || — || Angel Stadium || 43,829 || 55–44 || L1
|- style="text-align:center; background:#fbb;"
| 100 || July 23 || @  Angels || 2–3 || Bridwell (4–1) || Porcello (4–13) || Norris (15) || Angel Stadium || 40,471 || 55–45 || L2
|- style="text-align:center; background:#fbb;"
| 101 || July 24 || @ Mariners || 0–4 || Paxton (10–3) || Rodríguez (4–3) ||  || Safeco Field || 29,262 || 55–46 || L3
|- style="text-align:center; background:#fbb;"
| 102 || July 25 || @ Mariners || 5–6 (13) || Zych (5–2) || Fister (0–5) ||  || Safeco Field || 28,992 || 55–47 || L4
|- style="text-align:center; background:#bfb;"
| 103 || July 26 || @  Mariners || 4–0 || Sale (13–4) || Moore (1–3) || Kimbrel (25) || Safeco Field || 39,797 || 56–47 || W1
|- style="text-align:center; background:#fbb;"
| 104 || July 28 ||  Royals || 2–4 || Vargas (13–4) || Porcello (4–14) || Herrera (22) || Fenway Park || 37,321 || 56–48 || L1
|- style="text-align:center; background:#bfb;"
| 105 || July 29 ||  Royals || 9–8 (10) || Barnes (6–2) || Minor (5–3) || — || Fenway Park || 36,912 || 57–48 || W1
|- style="text-align:center; background:#fbb;"
| 106 || July 30 ||  Royals || 3–5 || Hammel (5–8) || Barnes (6–3) || Herrera (23) || Fenway Park || 36,480 || 57–49 || L1
|- style="text-align:center; background:#bfb;"
| 107 || July 31 || Indians || 6–2 || Fister (1–5) || Clevinger (5–4) ||  || Fenway Park || 37,169 || 58–49 || W1
|-

|- style="text-align:center; background:#bfb;"
| 108 || August 1 ||  Indians || 12–10 || Kimbrel (3–0) || Allen (0–6) || — || Fenway Park || 37,126 || 59–49 || W2
|- style="text-align:center; background:#bbb;"
| — || August 2 ||  Indians || colspan="8" |Postponed (rain). Makeup date: August 14.
|- style="text-align:center; background:#bfb;"
| 109 || August 3 ||  White Sox || 9–5 || Porcello (5–14) || González (5–10) || — || Fenway Park || 37,442 || 60–49 || W3
|- style="text-align:center; background:#bfb;"
| 110 || August 4 ||  White Sox || 3–2 (11) || Hembree (2–3) || Bummer (0–2) || — || Fenway Park || 36,612 || 61–49 || W4
|- style="text-align:center; background:#bfb;"
| 111 || August 5 ||  White Sox || 4–1 || Pomeranz (11–4) || Shields (2–4) || Kimbrel (26) || Fenway Park || 36,599 || 62–49 || W5
|- style="text-align:center; background:#bfb;"
| 112 || August 6 || White Sox || 6–3 || Fister (2–5) || Pelfrey (3–10) || Kimbrel (27) || Fenway Park || 37,283 || 63–49 || W6
|- style="text-align:center; background:#bfb;"
| 113 || August 8 || @  Rays || 2–0 || Sale (14–4) || Pruitt (6–3) || Kimbrel (28) || Tropicana Field || 22,328 || 64–49 || W7
|- style="text-align:center; background:#bfb;"
| 114 || August 9 || @  Rays || 8–2 || Porcello (6–14) || Odorizzi (6–5) || — || Tropicana Field || 11,853 || 65–49 || W8
|- style="text-align:center; background:#fbb;"
| 115 || August 11 || @  Yankees || 4–5 || Warren (3–2) || Reed (1–3) || Chapman (15) || Yankee Stadium || 46,509 || 65–50 || L1
|- style="text-align:center; background:#bfb;"
| 116 || August 12 || @  Yankees || 10–5 || Pomeranz (12–4) || Severino (9–5) || — || Yankee Stadium || 47,241 || 66–50 || W1
|- style="text-align:center; background:#bfb;"
| 117 || August 13 || @  Yankees || 3–2 (10) || Kimbrel (4–0) || Chapman (4–2) || — || Yankee Stadium || 46,610 || 67–50 || W2
|- style="text-align:center; background:#fbb;"
| 118 || August 14 ||  Indians || 3–7 || Bauer (11–8) || Fister (2–6) || — || Fenway Park || 37,430 || 67–51 || L1
|- style="text-align:center; background:#bfb;"
| 119 || August 15 ||  Cardinals || 10–4 || Porcello (7–14) || Leake (7–11) || — || Fenway Park || 37,345 || 68–51 || W1
|- style="text-align:center; background:#bfb;"
| 120 || August 16 ||  Cardinals || 5–4 || Kimbrel (5–0) || Duke (0–1) || — || Fenway Park || 37,181 || 69–51 || W2
|- style="text-align:center; background:#bfb;"
| 121 || August 18 || Yankees || 9–6 || Reed (2–3) || Kahnle (2–4) || Kimbrel (29) || Fenway Park || 36,784 || 70–51 || W3
|- style="text-align:center; background:#fbb;"
| 122 || August 19 ||  Yankees || 3–4 || Sabathia (10–5) || Sale (14–5) || Betances (9) || Fenway Park || 36,784 || 70–52 || L1
|- style="text-align:center; background:#bfb;"
| 123 || August 20 || Yankees || 5–1 || Porcello (8–14) || Gray (7–8) ||  || Fenway Park || 36,911 || 71–52 || W1
|- style="text-align:center; background:#fbb;"
| 124 || August 21 || @  Indians || 4–5 || Allen (1–6) || Workman (0–1) || — || Progressive Field || 21,428 || 71–53 || L1
|- style="text-align:center; background:#bfb;"
| 125 || August 22 || @ Indians || 9–1 || Fister (3–6) || Carrasco (12–6) ||  || Progressive Field || 19,563 || 72–53 || W1
|- style="text-align:center; background:#bfb;"
| 126 || August 23 || @ Indians || 6–1 || Pomeranz (13–4) || Kluber (12–4) ||  || Progressive Field || 25,346 || 73–53 || W2
|- style="text-align:center; background:#fbb;"
| 127 || August 24 || @ Indians || 6–13 || Bauer (13–8) || Sale (14–6) ||  || Progressive Field || 21,643 || 73–54 || L1
|- style="text-align:center; background:#fbb;"
| 128 || August 25 ||  Orioles || 3–16 || Hellickson (8–7) || Porcello (8–15) || — || Fenway Park || 37,191 || 73–55 || L2
|- style="text-align:center; background:#fbb;"
| 129 || August 26 ||  Orioles || 0–7 || Gausman (10–9) || Rodríguez (4–4) || — || Fenway Park || 36,655 || 73–56 || L3
|- style="text-align:center; background:#fbb;"
| 130 || August 27 ||  Orioles || 1–2 || Miley (8–10) || Fister (3–7) || Brach (17) || Fenway Park || 36,625 || 73–57 || L4
|- style="text-align:center; background:#bfb;"
| 131 || August 28 || @ Blue Jays || 6–5 || Pomeranz (14–4) || Barnes (2–5) || Kimbrel (30) || Rogers Centre || 35,630 || 74–57 || W1
|- style="text-align:center; background:#bfb;"
| 132 || August 29 || @  Blue Jays || 3–0 || Sale (15–6) || Anderson (2–3) || Kimbrel (31) || Rogers Centre || 34,674 || 75–57 || W2
|- style="text-align:center; background:#bfb;"
| 133 || August 30 || @ Blue Jays || 7–1 || Porcello (9–15) || Koehler (1–7) ||  || Rogers Centre || 37,693 || 76–57 || W3
|- style="text-align:center; background:#fbb;"
| 134 || August 31 || @ Yankees || 2–6 || Sabathia (11–5) || Rodríguez (4–5) ||  || Yankee Stadium || 43,309 || 76–58 || L1
|-

|- style="text-align:center; background:#bfb;"
| 135 || September 1 || @  Yankees || 4–1 || Fister (4–7) || Gray (8–9) || Kimbrel (32) || Yankee Stadium || 42,332 || 77–58 || W1
|- style="text-align:center; background:#fbb;"
| 136 || September 2 || @  Yankees || 1–5 || Tanaka (11–10) || Pomeranz (14–5) || — || Yankee Stadium || 46,536 || 77–59 || L1
|- style="text-align:center; background:#fbb;"
| 137 || September 3 || @  Yankees || 2–9 || Severino (12–6) || Sale (15–7) || — || Yankee Stadium || 46,717 || 77–60 || L2
|- style="text-align:center; background:#fbb;"
| 138 || September 4 ||  Blue Jays || 4–10 || Happ (7–10) || Porcello (9–16) || — || Fenway Park || 34,311 || 77–61 || L3
|- style="text-align:center; background:#bfb;"
| 139 || September 5 || Blue Jays || 3–2 (19) || Velázquez (3–1) || Rowley (1–2) ||  || Fenway Park || 33,009 || 78–61 || W1
|- style="text-align:center; background:#bfb;"
| 140 || September 6 ||  Blue Jays || 6–1 || Fister (5–7) || Biagini (3–10) || — || Fenway Park || 33,190 || 79–61 || W2
|- style="text-align:center; background:#bfb;"
| 141 || September 8 ||  Rays || 9–3 || Pomeranz (15–5) || Archer (9–9) || — || Fenway Park || 34,781 || 80–61 || W3
|- style="text-align:center; background:#bfb;"
| 142 || September 9 ||  Rays || 9–0 || Sale (16–7) || Andriese (5–3) || — || Fenway Park || 36,734 || 81–61 || W4
|- style="text-align:center; background:#fbb;"
| 143 || September 10 ||  Rays || 1–4 || Cobb (11–9) || Porcello (9–17) || Colomé (43) || Fenway Park || 35,859 || 81–62 || L1
|- style="text-align:center; background:#bfb;"
| 144 || September 12 ||  Athletics || 11–1 || Rodríguez (5–5) || Manaea (10–10) || — || Fenway Park || 34,355 || 82–62 || W1
|- style="text-align:center; background:#fbb;"
| 145 || September 13 ||  Athletics || 3–7 || Cotton (8–10) || Fister (5–8) || — || Fenway Park || 36,366 || 82–63 || L1
|- style="text-align:center; background:#bfb;"
| 146 || September 14 ||  Athletics || 6–2 || Pomeranz (16–5) || Gossett (4–9) || — || Fenway Park || 35,470 || 83–63 || W1
|- style="text-align:center; background:#bfb;"
| 147 || September 15 || @  Rays || 13–6 (15) || Workman (1–1) || Pruitt (7–5) || — || Tropicana Field || 16,006 || 84–63 || W2
|- style="text-align:center; background:#bfb;"
| 148 || September 16 || @  Rays || 3–1 || Porcello (10–17) || Cobb (11–10) || Kimbrel (33) || Tropicana Field || 14,942 || 85–63 || W3
|- style="text-align:center; background:#fbb;"
| 149 || September 17 || @  Rays || 2–3 || Odorizzi (9–8) || Rodríguez (5–6) || Colomé (45) || Tropicana Field || 14,936 || 85–64 || L1
|- style="text-align:center; background:#bfb;"
| 150 || September 18 || @  Orioles || 10–8 (11) || Barnes (7–3) || Castro (3–2) || Smith (1) || Camden Yards || 16,716 || 86–64 || W1
|- style="text-align:center; background:#bfb;"
| 151 || September 19 || @  Orioles || 1–0 (11) || Kelly (4–1) || Brach (4–5) || Barnes (1) || Camden Yards || 21,449 || 87–64 || W2 
|- style="text-align:center; background:#039;"
| 152 || September 20 || @  Orioles || 9–0 || Sale (17–7) || Miley (8–14) || — || Camden Yards || 16,906 || 88–64 || W3 
|- style="text-align:center; background:#bfb;"
| 153 || September 22 || @  Reds || 5–4 || Price (6–3) || Romano (5–7) || Kimbrel (34) || Great American Ball Park || 23,463 || 89–64 || W4 
|- style="text-align:center; background:#bfb;"
| 154 || September 23 || @  Reds || 5–0 || Rodríguez (6–6) || Stephenson (5–6) || — || Great American Ball Park || 36,076 || 90–64 || W5 
|- style="text-align:center; background:#bfb;"
| 155 || September 24 || @  Reds || 5–4 || Scott (2–1) || Iglesias (3–3) || Kimbrel (35) || Great American Ball Park || 25,545 || 91–64 || W6 
|- style="text-align:center; background:#fbb;"
| 156 || September 25 ||  Blue Jays || 4–6 || Anderson (4–4) || Pomeranz (16–6) || Osuna (38) || Fenway Park || 33,940 || 91–65 || L1 
|- style="text-align:center; background:#fbb;"
| 157 || September 26 ||  Blue Jays || 4–9 || Happ (10–11) || Sale (17–8) || — || Fenway Park || 33,999 || 91–66 || L2
|- style="text-align:center; background:#bfb;"
| 158 || September 27 || Blue Jays || 10–7 || Porcello (11–17) || Estrada (10–9) || — || Fenway Park || 34,445 || 92–66 || W1
|- style="text-align:center; background:#fbb;"
| 159 || September 28 ||  Astros || 2–12 || Peacock (13–2) || Rodríguez (6–7) || — || Fenway Park || 34,222 || 92–67 || L1
|- style="text-align:center; background:#fbb;"
| 160 || September 29 ||  Astros || 2–3 || Morton (14–7) || Fister (5–9) || Giles (33) || Fenway Park || 36,623 || 92–68 || L2
|- style="text-align:center; background:#090;"
| 161 || September 30 || Astros || 6–3 || Pomeranz (17–6) || McCullers Jr. (7–4) || — || Fenway Park || 35,722 || 93–68 || W1 
|- style="text-align:center; background:#fbb;"
| 162 || October 1 ||  Astros || 3–4 || McHugh (5–2) || Abad (2–1) || Clippard (5) || Fenway Park || 34,517 || 93–69 || L1
|-

|Reference:

Postseason game log

|- style="text-align:center; background:#fbb;"
| 1  || October 5 || @ Astros || 2–8 || Verlander (1–0) || Sale (0–1)  || — || Minute Maid Park || 43,102 || 0–1 || L1
|- style="text-align:center; background:#fbb;"
| 2  || October 6 || @ Astros || 2–8 || Keuchel (1–0) || Pomeranz (0–1) || — || Minute Maid Park || 43,410 || 0–2 || L2
|- style="text-align:center; background:#bfb;"
| 3  || October 8 || Astros || 10–3 || Kelly (1–0) || Liriano (0–1) || — || Fenway Park || 38,010 || 1–2 || W1
|- style="text-align:center;  background:#fbb;"
| 4  || October 9 || Astros || 4–5 || Verlander (2–0) || Sale (0–2) || Giles (1) || Fenway Park || 37,305 || 1–3 || L1
|- style="text-align:center; background-color:#933;color:white;"
|colspan="11"|Red Sox lose series 1–3
|-

Grand slams
The Red Sox were the only American League team not to hit a grand slam during the 2017 season.

Ejections

 postseason game

Source:

Detailed records

Statistics
Please note only the statistics from playing with the Red Sox are included in this list.

Regular Season Batting
Note: G = Games played; AB = At bats; R = Runs scored; H = Hits; 2B = Doubles; 3B = Triples; HR = Home runs; RBI = Runs batted in; SB = Stolen bases; BB = Walks; AVG = Batting average; Ref. = Reference
Top ten batters shown. Qualified batters in bold.

Top 10 hitters determined by fWAR:

Regular Season Pitching
Note: G = Games pitched; GS = Games started; W = Wins; L = Losses; SV = Saves; ERA = Earned run average; WHIP = Walks plus hits per inning pitched; IP = Innings pitched; H = Hits allowed; R = Total runs allowed; ER = Earned runs allowed; BB = Walks allowed; K = Strikeouts; HLD = Holds; Ref. = Reference
Top ten pitchers shown. Qualified pitchers in bold.

Top 10 pitchers determined by fWAR:

Postseason Batting

Postseason Pitching

Awards and honors

 Started game in CF due to injury of Mike Trout

Farm system

Source:

References

Further reading

External links
 2017 Boston Red Sox Season at Baseball Reference
 2017 Boston Red Sox season at Official Site
 2017 Boston Red Sox season at ESPN
 2017 Boston Red Sox Media Guide
 2017 Boston Red Sox Draft Selections

Boston Red Sox
Red Sox
Boston Red Sox
American League East champion seasons
Boston Red Sox seasons